Spyridonas Chrysanthakidis (Greek: Σπυρίδωνας Χρυσανθακίδης, 1862-mid 20th century, year unknown) was a Greek politician of Achaia and a mayor of Patras.

He was born in Patras in 1862 and was a mayoral leader.  In the same year, he was appointed mayor of Patras, replacing Periklis Kalamogdartis.  During his tenure, he began the numbering of houses and naming of streets in Patras. He remained in the office for the four whole years, being succeeded by the newly elected Kalamogdartis in 1866.

References

The first version of the article is translated and is based from the article at the Greek Wikipedia (el:Main Page)

1862 births
20th-century deaths
Year of death missing
Mayors of Patras
Politicians from Patras